Fondazione Roma formerly Fondazione Cassa di Risparmio di Roma is a charity organization based in Rome, Italy. The organization was re-founded as a banking foundation in 1991, by spin-off its banking activities (Cassa di Risparmio di Roma) to merge with other Roman banks to form Banca di Roma S.p.A. (the predecessor of Capitalia). The foundation remained as a shareholder of UniCredit, the banking group that acquired Capitalia in mid-2007. As at 31 December 2006, the foundation was the second largest shareholder of Capitalia for 5.02% stake.

At 31 December 2007 the foundation owned 1.13% stake of UniCredit. It was diluted to 0.956% in 2009, 0.484% in 2013. (increased back to 0.478% in 2014 due to decrease in total share capital of the bank)

As at 31 December 2015, the foundation had a shareholders' equity of €1.522 billion.

History

Cassa di Risparmio di Roma

Cassa di Risparmio di Roma was an Italian saving bank founded in 1836 by the decree of Pope Gregory XVI. In 1937 the bank absorbed Rome mount of piety (founded in 1539). In 1991–92 the bank spin off the banking activities and inject to a società per azioni (company limited by shares) in exchange for new shares. The S.p.A. later became part of Banca di Roma S.p.A. and the legal person of the former bank was renamed from Cassa di Risparmio di Roma to Fondazione Cassa di Risparmio di Roma.

Fondazione Roma
Fondazione Cassa di Risparmio di Roma was renamed into Fondazione Roma in 2007. The brand Banca di Roma was retained by UniCredit until 2010.

As at 31 December 2015, the foundation still owned 0.479% stake of UniCredit, or 28,571,220 number of shares.

Fondazione Roma invested in a private equity fund family Fondaco Roma Fund, which Fondaco SGR was the manager. 

The foundation owned 100% distribution units of the sub-funds Fondaco Roma Global Equity Satellite I, II & II, Global Bond Satellite I & II, Global Balanced Core (the capitalisation units of the sub-fund was not owned by the foundation) and Emerging Markets Bond, which had a consolidated net asset value of €1.392 billion (€1.359 billion contributed to the foundation)

The fund family invested in Alibaba Group, Baidu, Ctrip, Tencent Holdings, Novozymes, Hermès, Kering, L'Oréal, Rocket Internet, AIA Group, Stratasys, Inditex, Atlas Copco, ARM Holdings, Burberry, Alphabet Inc., Amazon.com, Bluebird Bio, Facebook, Illumina, Intuitive Surgical, Ionis Pharmaceuticals, Lending Club, LinkedIn, Netflix, Salesforce.com, Seattle Genetics, Splunk, Tesla Motors, TripAdvisor, Twitter, Whole Foods Market, Workday, Inc. (Global Equity Satellite I) as well as UniCredit (33,525 shares), Intesa Sanpaolo, Banca Monte dei Paschi di Siena, Banco Popolare and UBI Banca, etc. (Global Balanced Core)

References

External links
  

Banking foundations based in Italy
Organisations based in Rome
1991 establishments in Italy